The MacTier Subdivision is a major rail line in Ontario, Canada, which is owned and operated by the Canadian Pacific Railway. The line stretches  from Toronto in the south to MacTier in northern Muskoka. The MacTier Subdivision is the easternmost section of Canadian Pacific's present-day transcontinental route and is the railway's only connection between its eastern and western holdings which is fully within Canada. The route is single-track in its entirety and hosts only freight rail service. Between 1955 and 1978 the MacTier Subdivision hosted CPR's premier transcontinental passenger train, the Canadian, from Toronto to Vancouver.

Route

The MacTier Subdivision begins at the West Toronto Diamond, where it diverges northwest from the Galt Subdivision, which is also a part of the Canadian Pacific system. From here, the line parallels GO Transit's Kitchener line for about  until diverging north. Just after crossing into York, the railway crosses under Canadian National's Halton Subdivision. Here the line passes just east of CPR's Vaughan Intermodal facility. Following three sidings at Bolton, Palgrave and Baxter, the railway junctions with the Barrie Collingwood Railway, which runs east to Barrie. Following this junction, the route winds its way through northern Simcoe County until entering the dense forests of northern Ontario. The route enters Muskoka after crossing the Trent–Severn Waterway at Severn Falls. Travelling through the wilderness, the route reaches Bala, where it begins to parallel Canadian National's Bala Subdivision until reaching MacTier, Ontario. The subdivision ends at MacTier, where the Parry Sound Subdivision continues north to Sudbury.

Traffic
The Mactier sub handles intermodal and other freight traffic 

100, Vancouver BC to Toronto ON, Priority Intermodal, Daily
101, Toronto ON to Vancouver BC, Priority Intermodal, Daily
104, Vancouver BC to Toronto ON, Intermodal, Daily
105, Toronto ON to Vancouver BC, Intermodal, Daily
106, Vancouver BC to Toronto ON, Autoracks and Intermodal, As Needed 
112, Vancouver BC to Montreal QC, Intermodal, Daily
113, Montreal QC to Vancouver BC, Intermodal, Daily
118, Edmonton AB to Montreal QC, Intermodal, Daily
119, Montreal QC to Edmonton AB, Intermodal, Daily
420, Winnipeg MB to Toronto ON, Mixed Freight, Daily
421, Toronto ON to Winnipeg MB, Mixed Freight, Daily
422, Sudbury ON to Toronto ON, Mixed Frieght, As Needed
H17, Toronto ON to Spence Yard ON, Autoracks, As Needed
H28, Vaughan ON to Toronto ON, Intermodal and Mixed Freight, As Needed

Stations

The MacTier subdivision had three stations served by the Canadian, all closed in 1978:

West Toronto
Alliston
MacTier

See also

 Barrie Collingwood Railway
 List of Ontario railways

References

Canadian Pacific Railway lines in Ontario
Rail infrastructure in Simcoe County
Rail infrastructure in the District Municipality of Muskoka